Jakub Švec (born 23 July 2000) is a Slovak footballer who plays for MFK Skalica on loan from SK Dynamo České Budějovice as a forward.

Career
Švec made his Fortuna Liga debut for ViOn Zlaté Moravce against Zemplín Michalovce on 25 November 2017.

In January 2023, Švec returned to his native Slovakia with MFK Skalica on loan until the end of the season, with his parent club being based in the Czech Republic with SK Dynamo České Budějovice.

References

External links
 
 Eurofotbal profile 
 
 Futbalnet Profile 

2000 births
Living people
Sportspeople from Žiar nad Hronom
Association football forwards
Slovak footballers
Slovakia under-21 international footballers
FC ViOn Zlaté Moravce players
FC DAC 1904 Dunajská Streda players
FC ŠTK 1914 Šamorín players
MFK Tatran Liptovský Mikuláš players
SK Dynamo České Budějovice players
MFK Skalica players
Slovak Super Liga players
2. Liga (Slovakia) players
Expatriate footballers in the Czech Republic